Bachia bresslaui, also known commonly as Bresslau's bachia, is a species of lizard in the family Gymnophthalmidae. The species is native to southern South America.

Etymology
The specific name, bresslaui, is in honor of German zoologist Ernst Ludwig Bresslau.

Geographic range
B. bresslaui is found in southeastern Brazil, in the states of Bahia, Distrito Federal, Mato Grosso, Mato Grosso do Sul, and São Paulo. It is also found in Paraguay in Amambay Department.

Habitat
The preferred natural habitats of B. bresslaui are savanna and shrubland.

Description
B. bresslau has its front and back legs much reduced, each to one scale that resembles a toe.

Behavior
B. bresslaui is terrestrial and fossorial.

Reproduction
B. bresslaui is oviparous.

References

Further reading
Amaral A (1935). "Estudos sobre lacertilios neotropicos II. Novo genero e especie de lagarto do Brasil [= Studies on Neotropical Lacertilians II. A New Genus and Species of Lizard from Brazil]". Memórias do Instituto Butantan 9: 249–250. (Apatelus bresslaui, new species). (in Portuguese).
Colli GR, Zatz MG, da Cunha HJ (1998). "Notes on the ecology and geographical distribution of the rare Gymnophthalmid lizard Bachia bresslaui ". Herpetologica 54 (2): 169–174.
MacLean WP (1973). "On the third specimen of Bachia bresslaui (Sauria, Teiidae)". Papéis Avulsos de Zoologia, Museu de Zoologia da Universidade de São Paulo 27 (6): 81–82.
Vanzolini PE (1961). "Bachia: Especies brasileiras e conceito generico (Sauria: Teiidae) [= Bachia: Brazilian species and generic concept (Sauria: Teiidae)]". Pap. Avuls. Zool., Mus. Zool. Univ. São Paulo 14: 193–209. (Bachia bresslaui, new combination). (in Portuguese).
Vanzolini PE (1966). "Sobre o segundo exemplar de Bachia bresslaui [= On the second specimen of Bachia bresslaui ]". Pap. Avuls. Zool., Mus. Zool. Univ. São Paulo 19: 189–192. (in Portuguese).

Bachia
Reptiles described in 1935
Taxa named by Afrânio Pompílio Gastos do Amaral